The legislature of the U.S. state of Idaho has convened many times since statehood became effective on July 3, 1890.

Legislatures

See also
 List of governors of Idaho
 History of Idaho

References

External links
 , 2005-2016 eds.
 Idaho Legislature. Legislative Research Library. (Includes guides to researching legislative history).
 

Legislatures
Legislature
 
idaho
Idaho
Idaho
idaho